Let Mortal Heroes Sing Your Fame is the fifth studio album by the Austrian black metal band Summoning. It was released on 31 October 2001, through Napalm Records. It is the first of their releases to feature male clean vocals, on the chorus of "Farewell". It is also their first album to make extensive use of audio samples (taken from radio productions of The Lord of the Rings), giving the album a slight dramaturgic bent. The cover art is based on Mark Harrison's painting, Draco Niger Grandis (1999), surrounded by a frame coming from Akseli Gallen-Kallela's The Aino Myth (1891).

Track listing

Credits 

 Protector – guitar, keyboards, drum programming, vocals on "In Hollow Halls Beneath the Fells", "Our Foes Shall Fall", "Runes of Power", "Ashen Cold"
 Silenius – keyboards, vocals on tracks "South Away", "The Mountain King's Return", "Farewell"

References

External links 

 Let Mortal Heroes Sing Your Fame page at the band's official website (defunct)

2001 albums
Summoning (band) albums
Napalm Records albums